Albert Hofstadter (March 28, 1910 – January 26, 1989) was an American philosopher.

Life and career
Hofstadter taught at Columbia University (1950–67), the University of California at Santa Cruz (1968–75) and the New School for Social Research (1976–78). He was the elder brother of physicist and Nobel laureate Robert Hofstadter and the uncle of Robert's son, Douglas Hofstadter.

Thoughts on the later Heidegger
As a Heidegger scholar, Hofstadter contends that Heidegger is able to shape and use language in keeping with his basic insight that language is the house of Being, i.e., where humans dwell. "It is by staying with the thinking the language itself does that Heidegger is able to rethink, and thus think anew, the oldest, the perennial and perennially forgotten thoughts." One of these is the Being of beings in the sense of aletheia. Hofstadter praises Heidegger's project to free human beings from alienated ways of relating to things, "letting us find in it a real dwelling place instead of the cold, sterile hostelry in which we presently find ourselves."

Major works

Books (authored and edited)

Translations

Notes

References
 Bibliography of articles by Albert Hofstadter at philpapers.org

1910 births
1989 deaths
20th-century American Jews
Jewish philosophers
20th-century American philosophers
American philosophy academics
Columbia University faculty
University of California, Santa Cruz faculty
The New School faculty
Philosophers of art
Heidegger scholars
German–English translators
Philosophers from California
Philosophers from New York (state)